Litz Bluff is an ice-covered bluff  west of Mount Borgeson in the Walker Mountains, Thurston Island, Antarctica. Rock salients mark the face of the bluff. It was named by the Advisory Committee on Antarctic Names after Ensign M. Eugene Litz, navigator and second pilot of PBM Mariner aircraft in the Eastern Group of U.S. Navy Operation Highjump, which obtained aerial photographs of this bluff and coastal areas adjacent to Thurston Island, 1946–47.

References

Cliffs of Ellsworth Land